Bill Allen may refer to:

 Bill Allen (footballer) (1889–1948), Australian footballer and cricketer
 William McPherson Allen (1900–1985), CEO of Boeing
 Bill Allen (British politician) (1901–1973), MP for West Belfast 
 Bill "Hoss" Allen (1922–1997), American radio disc jockey
 Bill Allen (businessman, born 1937), American corporate executive and political financier
 Bill Allen (dentist) (born 1943), English dentist
 Bill Allen (basketball) (born 1945), American basketball player
 Bill Allen (Canadian politician) (born 1946), politician from Saskatchewan, Canada
 Bill Allen (actor) (born 1962), American film and television actor

See also
 Billy Allen (1917–1981), English footballer
 Will Allen (disambiguation)
 William Allan (disambiguation)
 William Allen (disambiguation)
 Willie Allen (disambiguation)
 Allen (surname)